KCBC (770 kHz) is a commercial AM radio station broadcasting a Christian talk and teaching radio format.  It is Licensed to Manteca, California, with radio studios and offices in Oakdale.  The station is owned by the Crawford Broadcasting Company with the license held by subsidiary Kiertron, Inc.  Live programming includes "The Bottom Line" from 3 to 5pm weekdays, a faith and freedom current events show with Roger Marsh.
 
By day, KCBC is powered at 50,000 watts, covering Stockton and Sacramento to the north, parts of the San Francisco Bay Area and San Jose to the west, as well as the Salinas-Monterey and Santa Cruz areas.  But because 770 AM is a clear channel frequency, KCBC must reduce power at night to 4,100 watts to reduce interference.  Programming is also heard on 250 watt FM translator 94.7 K234CV in Modesto.

Programming
KCBC has a schedule of national and local religious leaders.  The station is brokered, with hosts paying KCBC for time on the air.  During their programs, they may seek donations to their ministries.  Hosts include David Jeremiah, Charles Stanley, Joyce Meyer, J. Vernon McGee and Jim Daly.

History
On April 5, 1987, the station first signed on the air.  Its original city of license was Riverbank, California, and its first call sign was KPLA.  It was owned by the KPLA Partnership, airing a Christian format.  The studios and offices were in Oakdale, then and now.

KPLA had a Talk radio format from 1991 until 1993. It is the former home to Conservative Talk show host Geoff Metcalf.   It later changed its city of license to Manteca, returning to Christian radio when acquired by Crawford Broadcasting.

References

External links

Mass media in Stanislaus County, California
Radio stations established in 1987
1987 establishments in California
CBC